Earl Ingarfield may refer to:

 Earl Ingarfield, Sr., NHL player between 1958-1971
 Earl Ingarfield, Jr., NHL player between 1979-1981